Barsine rubricostata is a species of moth of the family Erebidae, subfamily Arctiinae. It is found in Peninsular Malaysia, Sumatra, Borneo. This is a generally rare species ranging from the lowlands to 1,790 meters.

External links
The Moths of Borneo

Nudariina
Moths of Asia
Moths described in 1855